Gabrielle Marie Adcock (née White; born 30 September 1990) is an English retired badminton player.

Career 
Gabby started playing badminton aged 10 in the badminton club at her school and became a full-time player straight from school at 16. She competes in badminton as a doubles specialist. In 2007, she won a bronze medal at the European Junior Badminton Championships in girls' doubles event partnered with Mariana Agathangelou. At the 2007 BWF World Junior Championships, she won a silver medal in mixed doubles event partnered with Chris Adcock. They were defeated by Lim Khim Wah and Ng Hui Lin of Malaysia in the finals round with the score 25–23, 20–22, and 19–21. Prior to the London Olympics she was paired with Robert Blair and Jenny Wallwork, though both pairs failed to qualify.

 She paired up with her husband Chris Adcock, whom she married in 2013, and won the 2013 Hong Kong Super Series against the world No.1 and Olympic Champion, Zhang Nan and Zhao Yunlei, 21–12, 21–16 in the semifinals round. They also won the 2014 Swiss Open Grand Prix Gold against Chai Biao and Tang Jinhua 21–17, 21–13. She competed in the 2014 Commonwealth Games, winning gold in the mixed doubles alongside her husband.

In 2015, she became the champion in mixed doubles at the 2015 BWF Super Series Masters Finals against Korean pair Ko Sung-hyun and Kim Ha-na. In 2016, she competed at the Summer Olympics in the mixed doubles event, but did not advance to the knockout stages.

In 2019, she qualified to represent Great Britain at the 2019 European Games and played in the mixed doubles with Chris Adcock. Competing as the top seeds, the duo advanced to the final, but was defeated by their compatriots Marcus Ellis and Lauren Smith in straight games 14–21, 9–21, and settled for a silver medal.

In January 2021, Adcock announced that she had tested positive for COVID-19 on 26 December 2020. As a result, she and Chris withdrew from the three tournaments scheduled to occur that month in Thailand: the Yonex Thailand Open, Toyota Thailand Open, and World Tour Finals.

Achievements

BWF World Championships 
Mixed doubles

Commonwealth Games 
Women's doubles

Mixed doubles

European Games 
Mixed doubles

European Championships 
Mixed doubles

BWF World Junior Championships 
Mixed doubles

European Junior Championships 
Girls' doubles

BWF World Tour (3 runners-up) 
The BWF World Tour, which was announced on 19 March 2017 and implemented in 2018, is a series of elite badminton tournaments sanctioned by the Badminton World Federation (BWF). The BWF World Tour is divided into levels of World Tour Finals, Super 1000, Super 750, Super 500, Super 300, and the BWF Tour Super 100.

Mixed doubles

BWF Superseries (2 titles, 2 runners-up) 
The BWF Superseries, which was launched on 14 December 2006 and implemented in 2007, was a series of elite badminton tournaments, sanctioned by the Badminton World Federation (BWF). BWF Superseries levels were Superseries and Superseries Premier. A season of Superseries consisted of twelve tournaments around the world that had been introduced since 2011. Successful players were invited to the Superseries Finals, which were held at the end of each year.

Mixed doubles

  BWF Superseries Finals tournament
  BWF Superseries Premier tournament
  BWF Superseries tournament

BWF Grand Prix (2 titles, 4 runners-up) 
The BWF Grand Prix had two levels, the Grand Prix and Grand Prix Gold. It was a series of badminton tournaments sanctioned by the Badminton World Federation (BWF) and played between 2007 and 2017.

Mixed doubles

  BWF Grand Prix Gold tournament
  BWF Grand Prix tournament

BWF International Challenge/Series (8 titles, 6 runners-up) 
Women's doubles

Mixed doubles

  BWF International Challenge tournament
  BWF International Series tournament

Record against selected opponents 
Mixed doubles results with Chris Adcock against Super Series finalists, Worlds semi-finalists, and Olympic quarterfinalists.

  He Hanbin & Yu Yang 0–1
  Xu Chen & Ma Jin 0–2
  Zhang Nan & Zhao Yunlei 1–12
  Liu Cheng & Bao Yixin 5–3
  Chai Biao & Tang Jinhua 1–0
  Chen Hung-ling & Cheng Wen-hsing 0–1
  Joachim Fischer Nielsen & Christinna Pedersen 2–5
  Anthony Clark & Donna Kellogg 0–2
  Michael Fuchs & Birgit Michels 3–1
  Tontowi Ahmad & Liliyana Natsir 4–9
  Riky Widianto & Richi Puspita Dili 1–0
  Kenichi Hayakawa & Misaki Matsutomo 4–1
  Ko Sung-hyun & Kim Ha-na 1–3
  Lee Yong-dae & Lee Hyo-jung 0–2
  Yoo Yeon-seong & Jang Ye-na 1–0
  Chan Peng Soon & Goh Liu Ying 2–2
  Robert Mateusiak & Nadieżda Zięba 2–2
  Sudket Prapakamol & Saralee Thungthongkam 1–0
  Songphon Anugritayawon & Kunchala Voravichitchaikul 0–2

References

External links 

 
 
 
 
 
 
 

1990 births
Living people
People from Garforth
Sportspeople from Leeds
People educated at Garforth Academy
English female badminton players
Badminton players at the 2016 Summer Olympics
Olympic badminton players of Great Britain
Badminton players at the 2010 Commonwealth Games
Badminton players at the 2014 Commonwealth Games
Badminton players at the 2018 Commonwealth Games
Commonwealth Games gold medallists for England
Commonwealth Games silver medallists for England
Commonwealth Games bronze medallists for England
Commonwealth Games medallists in badminton
Badminton players at the 2019 European Games
European Games silver medalists for Great Britain
European Games medalists in badminton
Medallists at the 2014 Commonwealth Games
Medallists at the 2018 Commonwealth Games